Southern High School is a public secondary school located at 1 Jose Perez Leon Guerrero Drive in the village of Santa Rita, in the United States territory of Guam. The school, a part of the  Guam Public School System, opened in 1997 and serves grades 9 through 12. Southern High  serves the villages of Santa Rita, Agat, Asan-Maina, Inarajan, Merizo, Piti, Talofofo, Umatac, and Yona.

Student body
During the 1999–2000 school year, the school had 1,700 students: 83% Chamorro, 9% Filipino, 3% White American, 2% other Pacific Islanders, and 1% Asian.

Athletics
Students may participate in interscholastic athletics if they are under the age of nineteen on September 1 of the applicable school year.

School athletics, male and female, include:

Coeducational:
American football
Cheerleading
Paddling
Rugby
Wrestling

Male only:
Baseball

Female only:
Softball

The school has a varsity and a junior varsity team each for volleyball and basketball.

Notable alumni
 John Hattig - Guam's first Major League Baseball player
 Michael San Nicolas - delegate to the U.S. House of Representatives (2019–2023)

References

External links

 Southern High School
 Southern High School (archive)
 Southern High School 2007 Accreditation Report

Public high schools in Guam